The Mount Horeb Area School District is a school district based in Mount Horeb, and serves the communities of Mount Horeb and Blue Mounds.

The district administers 5 schools, 2 elementary schools, one intermediate school, one middle school, and one high school. It has an enrollment of over 2,500 students.

Schools

Secondary

 Mount Horeb High School
 Mount Horeb Middle School

Intermediate

 Mount Horeb Intermediate Center

Elementary

 Mount Horeb Primary Center
 Mount Horeb Early Learning Center

References

School districts in Wisconsin
Education in Dane County, Wisconsin